The Women's Marathon event at the 1999 World Championships in Seville, Spain was held on Sunday August 29, 1999.

Medalists

Abbreviations
All times shown are in hours:minutes:seconds

Records

Intermediates

Final ranking

See also
 1998 Women's European Championships Marathon (Budapest)
 1999 World Marathon Cup
 2000 Women's Olympic Marathon (Sydney)
 2002 Women's European Championships Marathon (Munich)

References
 Results
 IAAF results
 trackandfieldnews

M
Marathons at the World Athletics Championships
1999 marathons
Women's marathons
World Championships in Athletics marathon
Marathons in Spain

nl:IAAF wereldkampioenschap marathon 1999